Nechesia is a monotypic moth genus of the family Erebidae. Its only species, Nechesia albotentata, is found in Borneo. Both the genus and the species were first described by Francis Walker in 1862.

References

Hypeninae
Monotypic moth genera